EWK may refer to:

 Ewert Karlsson (1918–2004), Swedish political cartoonist
 Eberhard W. Kornfeld (born 1923), Swiss auctioneer, gallerist, author, art dealer and collector in Berne
 Newton City/County Airport, in Kansas, United States
 Ex-works